Barbers is an unincorporated community in Colquitt County, in the U.S. state of Georgia.

History
A variant name was "Barber". The community was named after William H. Barber, a local businessman. A post office called Barber was established in 1901, and remained in operation until 1907. Besides the post office, the community had a railroad depot.

References

Unincorporated communities in Colquitt County, Georgia
Unincorporated communities in Georgia (U.S. state)